Phillips Nunatak is a nunatak along the edge of a small ice escarpment 7 nautical miles (13 km) north of Mount Wanous in the Patuxent Range, Pensacola Mountains, Queen Elizabeth Land, Antarctica. Mapped by United States Geological Survey (USGS) from surveys and U.S. Navy air photos, 1956–66. Named by Advisory Committee on Antarctic Names (US-ACAN) for Harry G. Phillips, cook at Palmer Station, winter 1967.

Nunataks of Queen Elizabeth Land